Santiago González and Andrés Molteni defeated Andrej Martin and Tristan-Samuel Weissborn in the final, 7–5, 6–3, to win the doubles tennis title at the 2022 Córdoba Open. It was their third career ATP Tour doubles title together. As alternates, Martin and Weissborn were competing in their second event as a team.

Rafael Matos and Felipe Meligeni Alves were the defending champions, but lost in the quarterfinals to Martin and Weissborn.

Seeds

Draw

Draw

References

External links
 Main draw

Córdoba Open
Córdoba Open